Francisco de la Cruz Suero also known as Frank Suero was a Dominican comedian and actor who made several characters with leading comedians of this generation, and which, like him, have excelled, was the program producer and comedian Dime a Ve until death. Frank Suero had outstanding participation with their characters in various humorous programs of this channel, these "Atrapado", "Quédate ahí," followed by "Titiri Mundati". On Ruta Telemicro, which is carried to all the peoples of the country, was the comedian and character.

He died from complication of diabetes and hypertension on June 6, 2012.

Characters 
La Sexy
María Cristina
Pichón
Molongo
El Duende

Filmography

References

External links

1960 births
2012 deaths
Dominican Republic male comedians
Dominican Republic male film actors
Dominican Republic male television actors
People from San Cristóbal Province